The 2014 NRL Under-20s season (known commercially as the 2014 Holden Cup due to sponsorship from Holden) was the seventh season of the National Rugby League's Under-20s competition. For the five years from the competition's inception, between 2008 and 2012, it had been known as the Toyota Cup. Holden became Naming Rights sponsors from 2013 onwards. The draw and structure of the competition mirrored that of the 2014 NRL Telstra Premiership.

Season summary

Ladder

Stats

Leading try scorers 
Sam Young - 69

Leading goal scorers

Leading field goal scorers

Grand final

See also

2014 in rugby league
2014 NRL season

References

External links
Official website
Statistics & Match Reports